Efecan Karaca (born 16 November 1989) is a Turkish footballer who plays for Alanyaspor. He is a product of the Galatasaray youth academy.

Efecan has represented the Turkish Football Federation at the U18 and U19 levels. On 25 March 2019, he made a debut in the national senior team in a 4–0 home win against Moldova.

International goals 

Scores and results list Turkey's goal tally first.

References

External links
 
 

Turkish footballers
Turkey youth international footballers
Turkey international footballers
Turkish Muslims
1989 births
Living people
People from Fatih
Footballers from Istanbul
Süper Lig players
Galatasaray S.K. footballers
Gaziantepspor footballers
Kartalspor footballers
Adanaspor footballers
Adana Demirspor footballers
Sarıyer S.K. footballers
Alanyaspor footballers
Association football midfielders